Eastern Oromo is a form of Oromo language spoken in the East Hararghe Zone, West Hararghe Zone and northern Bale Zone of the Oromia Region of Ethiopia.

According to [Ethnologue], there are 10 million speakers of this Oromo form. However, the 1994 Ethiopian national census did not break down language speakers according to dialect, although it reported 2,570,293 speakers of Oromo in those two zones.

References

Literature
Owens, Jonathan. 1985. A grammar of Harar Oromo (Northeastern Ethiopia): including a text and a glossary. Cushitic language studies; Bd. 4) Hamburg: Buske.

Languages of Ethiopia
Oromo groups